Johanna Samuels is an American folk musician from New York.

History
Samuels originated from New York City. Samuels released her debut full-length album in 2013 titled Double Blind. Samuels followed up that release in 2016 with her first EP titled Home & Dry: Told a Lie. Samuels released her second EP in 2019 titled Have A Good One. In 2021, Samuels released her second full-length album titled Excelsior!.

References

Living people
Year of birth missing (living people)
Folk musicians from New York (state)
Singers from New York City
American folk singers